"I Remember You" is the sixth single by the Japanese artist Yui. It was released on September 20, 2006, under Sony Records. This single is Yui's first single that has two editions.

Track listing
Normal Edition

Limited Edition
Normal Edition + DVD

Oricon sales chart (Japan)

Music video (PV)
The music video/promotion video for "I Remember You" features settings from Yui's first movie, "Taiyou no Uta" where her previous single, "Good-bye Days" was featured.

2006 singles
Yui (singer) songs
Songs written by Yui (singer)